"Julia" is a song by the English rock band the Beatles from their 1968 double album The Beatles (also known as "the White Album"). It is performed as a solo piece by John Lennon. The song was written by Lennon (though credited to Lennon–McCartney) about his mother Julia Lennon, who died in 1958 at age 44.

The track is the final song on side two (disc one on CD) of The Beatles and was the last song recorded for the album. In 1976, it was issued as the B-side of the Beatles single "Ob-La-Di, Ob-La-Da".

Composition
"Julia" was written by John Lennon (credited to Lennon–McCartney) in the key of D major and features Lennon on vocals and acoustic guitar. It was written during the Beatles' 1968 visit to Rishikesh in northern India, where they were studying under the Maharishi Mahesh Yogi. It was here that Lennon learned the song's finger-picking guitar style (known as 'Travis-picking') from the Scottish musician Donovan. Donovan later explained:

No other Beatle sings or plays on the song. While Paul McCartney made several "solo" recordings attributed to the group, dating back to his famous song "Yesterday", this is the only time that Lennon played and sang unaccompanied on a Beatles track. The ballad itself was the final track to be composed during recording sessions for The Beatles.

"Julia" was written for John's mother, Julia Lennon (1914–1958), who was killed by a car driven by an off-duty probationary police officer when John was 17 years old. Julia Lennon had encouraged her son's interest in music and bought him his first guitar. But after she split with John's father, John was taken in by his aunt, Mimi, and Julia started a new family with another man; though she lived just a few miles from John, Julia did not spend much time with him for a number of years. Their relationship began to improve as he neared adolescence, though, and in the words of his half-sister, Julia Baird:

"I lost her twice," Lennon said. "Once as a five-year-old when I was moved in with my auntie. And once again when she actually physically died."

The song was also written for his future wife Yoko Ono, whose first name, which literally means "child of the sea" in Japanese, is echoed in the lyric "Oceanchild, calls me." Towards the end of his life, he often called Yoko "Mother."

The line "Half of what I say is meaningless, but I say it just to reach you" was a slight variation of Kahlil Gibran's "Sand and Foam" (1926) in which the original verse reads, "Half of what I say is meaningless, but I say it so that the other half may reach you". Lennon also adapted the lines "When I cannot sing my heart, I can only speak my mind" from Gibran's "When life does not find a singer to sing her heart she produces a philosopher to speak her mind".

Personnel 
Personnel per Ian MacDonald

 John Lennon - double-tracked vocal, double-tracked acoustic guitar

Releases and legacy
"Julia" was originally released as the final song on side two of The Beatles on 22 November 1968. In 1976, it was released as the B-side of the "Ob-La-Di, Ob-La-Da" single. In 1988, "Julia" was one of the nine Beatles songs on the soundtrack album Imagine: John Lennon. In 2006, a portion was used for the Love album, mixed with "Eleanor Rigby".

Coinciding with the 50th anniversary of its release, Jacob Stolworthy of The Independent listed "Julia" at number 13 in his ranking of the White Album's 30 tracks. He commented: "The first disc ends on a sanguine note with Lennon's ode to his deceased mother, Julia. It remains the only Beatles song he wrote and performed by himself."

Other recordings
In 1969, Ramsey Lewis included it on his Mother Nature's Son album. This version went to #76 on the US Hot 100 and #37 on the Best Selling Soul Singles chart.

Notes

References

External links
 
 Walter Everett's analysis of "Julia" (pp. 170–72)

1960s ballads
The Beatles songs
1968 songs
Folk ballads
Song recordings produced by George Martin
Songs written by Lennon–McCartney
Capitol Records singles
1976 singles
Songs published by Northern Songs
Commemoration songs
English folk songs